Khlong Chedi Bucha is a khlong (canal) in central Thailand. This khlong  has a similar origin to the Khlong Maha Sawat, that continues westward all the way to Phra Pathom Chedi, the country's largest and oldest pagoda with one of its most revered.

Both khlongs were dug during the King Mongkut (Rama IV)'s reign to shorten travel time for the monarch and other pilgrims from Bangkok who wish to visit the grand pagoda.

After the restoration of Phra Pathom Chedi was completed in the year 1853 by Somdet Chao Phraya Borom Maha Prayurawongse (Tish Bunnag). But the excavation was not completed, the project director Prayurawongse had died before. The whole excavation mission was transferred to his son, Chaophraya Thiphakorawong  (Kham Bunnag), who hired Chinese laborers to continue dig. In which the king issued personal funds as expenses.

It was completed in the year 1862, and royally named as "Khlong Chedi Bucha", meaning "worshipped pagoda canal".

In the past, Khlong Chedi Bucha was considered the main route from Bangkok to Nakhon Pathom Province, since in those days there was no railroad. At the beginning of the khlong was a bustling market and community known as "Talat Tonson" (ตลาดต้นสน, "pine market"). It can be considered as a center of various goods. There were people from different regions traveling to trade and shop. The most famous goods was the black dyed fabric from indigo, which was very popular among farmers in those days.

The emerge of the Khlong Chedi Bucha resulting in province of Nakhon Pathom being more lively and prosperous too. King Mongkut also built a palace named "Pathomnakhon Palace" (พระราชวังปฐมนคร) to be used as a residence while he traveling to pay homage to the pagoda, it had steps leading down the khlong. Nowadays, it remains only ruins on an empty space beside the pagoda. In addition, there are also many markets, such as "Talat Lang" (ตลาดล่าง, "lower market")  and "Talat Bon" (ตลาดบน, "upper market") northward of the pagoda, because when traveling along the khlong, it will reach the Talat Bon first. Currently, they are maintained by Crown Property Bureau (CPB).

Before 1918, the bridge over khlong from Nakhon Pathom Railway Station to Phra Pathom Chedi, presumably only a wooden bridge. Later, this bridge was renovated into a modern concrete bridge named "Charoen Sattha" (เจริญศรัทธา, "prosperous faith"), designed by Prince Narisara Nuwattiwong in the  King Vajiravudh (Rama VI)'s reign.

At present, Khlong Chedi Buch is not the main route anymore, including the Talat Tonson, being in a lonely state.

References

Canals in Thailand
Geography of Nakhon Pathom province